Langan may refer to:

 Langan (surname)
 Ləngan, Azerbaijan
 Langan, Ille-et-Vilaine, France

See also
 Langan's Brasserie, London restaurant